Ali Amiri may refer to:

 Ali Amiri (historian) (1857–1923), Ottoman historian
 Ali Amiri (Afghan footballer) (born 1985), former German-Afghan footballer
 Ali Amiri (Iranian footballer) (born 1988), Iranian footballer for Rah Ahan
 Ali Amiri (Algerian footballer) (born 1987)